Philip Francis Pocock (2 July 1906 – 6 September 1984) was the Roman Catholic Archbishop of Toronto from 1971 to 1978.

Early years

Pocock was born  in St. Thomas, Ontario, on 2 July 1906. After studying theology at St. Peter's Seminary, London, Ontario, Bishop Denis P. O’Connor of Peterborough ordained him as a priest on 14 June 1930 at St. Peter's Cathedral, London. He worked in two parishes until 1933. In 1933 he left his parish to study canon law in Rome (graduating with a doctorate in canon law from the Angelicum University in 1934). He became a professor at St. Peter's Seminary, teaching moral theology and canon law until 1944.

On 7 April 1944, he was appointed Bishop of Saskatoon, Saskatchewan, after he was consecrated in St. Peter's Cathedral, London, by Most Reverend Ildebrando Antoniutti, Apostolic Delegate of Canada. He served in this position for seven years.  On 16 June 1951 he was named Apostolic Administrator of the Archdiocese of Winnipeg.  On 6 August 1951 he was appointed Coadjutor Archbishop of Winnipeg and Titular Archbishop of Aprus. The following year he succeeded as Archbishop of Winnipeg in January 1952.

Later years in Toronto

In 1961, Pocock left Winnipeg and became Coadjutor Archbishop of Toronto on 16 February 1961 and Titular Archbishop of Isauropolis to assist the then ailing archbishop, Cardinal James Charles McGuigan until his resignation on 30 March 1971. He succeeded as Archbishop of Toronto on 30 March 1971 and served until he resigned on 29 April 1978. During his tenure in Toronto Archbishop Pocock created the Archdiocesan Pastoral Council and the Senate of Priests. He encouraged the laity to participate in church decisions, the liturgy, and the Church's charitable works. Two Auxiliary Bishops, Thomas Fulton and Aloysius Ambrozic, were consecrated, and forty-five new parishes were established. Because of United Way's support of Planned Parenthood, Archbishop Pocock withdrew the Council of Catholic Charities and established ShareLife as a Catholic alternative. He lobbied for legislation against pornography and encouraged interfaith relations.

Return to parish work
He returned to life as a parish priest at St Mary's Parish in Brampton, Ontario. At St. Mary's, Pocock remained active as a priest by celebrating mass and confirmations and visiting a senior citizens' home. Upon his death, he was later given the title of Archbishop Emeritus of Toronto.

He died on 6 September 1984 and was interred in Holy Cross Cemetery in Thornhill, Ontario.

References

1906 births
1984 deaths
20th-century Roman Catholic archbishops in Canada
Roman Catholic archbishops of Toronto
People from St. Thomas, Ontario
Participants in the Second Vatican Council
St. Peter's Seminary (Diocese of London, Ontario) alumni
Roman Catholic archbishops of Winnipeg
Roman Catholic titular bishops
Roman Catholic bishops of Saskatoon